The Chlou Holy Cross Church is a ruined medieval church on the right bank of the Duabi river in the village of Chlou in Ochamchire Municipality, Abkhazia, an entity in the South Caucasus with a disputed political status.

Description of the ruins 
The church stands 20 km north of the town of Ochamchire on a hill overlooking the Duabi river and is surrounded by a large defensive wall built of large cobblestone. In some places the height of the wall is over 3 meters, the total length of the walls is 500 meters. The western wall of the fence runs through the river. The church walls have survived, but are gravely damaged.  It is a hall-church design with a semi-circular apse on the east. The vault has collapsed. The ruins are covered with shrubs of bushes.

History 
The church was likely built in the 14th or 15th century, but wall ornamentation may indicate an earlier date of the 11th-12th century. A stone slab found in the ruins display a Georgian inscription in the asomtavruli script, which is dated roughly to the 14th century when the area was under the sway of the Dadiani family of Mingrelia. It commemorates a high-ranking nobleman (eristavt-eristavi) whose name is reconstructed as Ozbeg Dadiani.

External links
Chlou Holy Cross Church. Historical monuments of Abkhazia — Government of the Autonomous Republic of Abkhazia.

References 

Churches in Abkhazia
Immovable Cultural Monuments of National Significance of Georgia